Korgan is a village in the Şemdinli District in Hakkâri Province in Turkey. The village is populated by Kurds of the Humaru tribe and had a population of 4,225 in 2022.

Korgan has the twelve hamlets of Akbal, Akkavak, Alkava, Balova, Durak, Güzelkonak, Aşağıkonak, Çevre, Üzümkıran, Yukarıkonak, Kanirihan and Tatlıca attached to it.

Population 
Population history of the village from 2000 to 2022:

References 

Villages in Şemdinli District
Kurdish settlements in Hakkâri Province